Norman Sylliboy of the Eskasoni First Nation in Nova Scotia was named Grand Chief of the Mi’kmaq Grand Council. Sylliboy was elected in 2019, two years after the death of his predecessor, Ben Sylliboy. Norman Sylliboy’s grandfather Gabriel Sylliboy was elected in 1918 to the position of Grand Chief.

Early life 
He was born into a Mi’kmaq family filled with culture and traditions. His family owned the first store in over forty years on the island Mniku in Potlotek. Before becoming Grand Chief of Mi’kmaq, he worked as a social worker and worked for Mi’kmaw Family and Children Services of Nova Scotia.

Political career 
He was selected as Grand Chief of Mi’kmaq on 1 August 2019. The selection for Grand Chief took place in St. Anne’s Mission at Potlotek First Nation, Chapel Island, Nova Scotia. The selection process included several rounds of selection until the council agreed with a consensus for Normal Sylliboy.

"I want to thank Niskkam(God-Creator). Thank the Grand Council for having faith in me and I want to thank all my family and their family in me. I want to thank Mi’kmaq Nation, from the bottom of my heart I want to thank each and everyone one of you".

Response to Covid-19 
He responded as Grand Chief with others including,Chief Paul Prosper, the Assembly of Nova Scotia Chiefs, and Premier Stephen McNeil urging people to stay home during the pandemic. They emphasized prioritizing the health of elders and other vulnerable community members.

Mi'kmaq Language Act 
The Mi'kmaq Language Act recognizes Mi’kmaw as the language of Nova Scotia. The Minister of L’nu Affairs Karla MacFarlane first announced the government’s plan to enact this legislation in October 2021. They have plans to take more steps in the promotion of the language because of the decreasing number of Mi'kmaw speakers. Norman Sylliboy stated that 

"The governments of the past attacked us through our language when our children were punished for speaking it, but despite all of the efforts to destroy it, our language is still here and we are still here, and that shows our resilience as a people."

Politics in the Mi'kmaq 
In 2011, the Canadian government announced the recognition of a group in Newfoundland and Labrador called the Qalipu First Nation. The landless band had accepted 25,000 people to be members of the community. The community had received over 100,000 applications and it was authorized for the new applicants to be reviewed. The Grand Council and other Mi'kmaw organizations argued against the legitimacy of these new members but in 2019 after the legitimacy of applicants had been addressed Qalipu First Nation had been accepted as a part of the Mi’kmaq Nation. Through these new changes by 2021 24,000 people had been recognized as offical members. There are current legal battles over the enrollment process including Friends of Qalipu Advocacy Association suing Qalipu First Nation.

Personal life 
Sylliboy married Arlene Sylliboy on 22 May 1982, having seven children together. They have six grandchildren together.

References 

21st-century Canadian politicians
21st-century First Nations people
Indigenous leaders in Atlantic Canada
Mi'kmaq people
Living people
1984 births